OK TV is an Indonesian general entertainment pay television channel owned by MNC Media.

OK TV launched on 13 March 2020, replacing MNC Channel, which was also broadcast outside of Indonesia. In addition to programming that aired on that channel, OK TV broadcasts variety programs previously aired by GTV and MNCTV, as well as some religious programming and overflow soccer matches from the MNC Sports and MNC Sports 2 channels.

References 

Television stations in Indonesia
Television channels and stations established in 2020
Media Nusantara Citra